Thomas Tidholm (born in Örebro on 11 April 1943) is a Swedish children's writer, poet, playwright, photographer, translator, and musician.  Since his debut as a poet in 1963, he has written poetry, novels, stage plays, and some thirty children's books (often collaborating with his wife, artist and writer Anna-Clara Tidholm).  He has directed short films for Sveriges Television, done youth theater for Unga Riks, and was a member of Swedish band Pärson Sound/International Harvester in the late sixties.  He's also known for the Swedish translation of the radio series and the first four novels in The Hitchhiker's Guide series.

References

External links 
Thomas Tidholm site

20th-century Swedish dramatists and playwrights
Swedish children's writers
20th-century Swedish poets
Sommar (radio program) hosts
People from Örebro
1943 births
Living people
Swedish male poets
Swedish male novelists
Swedish male dramatists and playwrights